The Luri is a coastal stream in the department of Haute-Corse, Corsica, France.
It flows across the Cap Corse peninsula to the Tyrrhenian Sea.

Course

It crosses the commune of Luri, Haute-Corse.
The only named tributary of the Luri is the  Ruisseau de Furcone, which enters the Luri from the south near of the village of Luri.
The Luri rises in the northwest of the Cap Corse peninsula to the northeast of the  Monte Grofiglieta.
It flows northeast past the village of Spergane, then east-southeast past the villages of Luri and Campo to enter the sea at Santa Severa.
The D180 follows the stream for most of its course.

Hydrology

Measurements of the river flow were taken at the Luri [Campo] station from 1972 to 1999.

Notes

Sources

Rivers of Haute-Corse
Rivers of France
Coastal basins of the Tyrrhenian Sea in Corsica